Padraig Ó Domhnallain, Irish short story writer, born 1884.

Born at Oughterard in 1884, he became a member of the Gaelic League in the early 1900s, and was a local organiser. He and Colm de Bhailís assisted Patrick Pearse during his time at Rosmuck, in collecting poems and songs of the region. His own short-stories were written in collaboration with Tomás Ó Raghallaigh and called Bruth-Fa-Thiar. He also translated Chekhov and Merimee into Irish.

Select bibliography
Conamara, Baile Ath Cliath, Mac Ghuill, 1925
Oidhre an Leighinn agus aisti eile, Baile Ath Cliath, Mac Ghuil, 1925
Tacar Amhrain, P.Do Domhnallain do dhioghluim agus do chuir le cheile, Dublin, Gill, 1925.
Sgealta Eorpacha, Dublin, Gill, 1927.
Ar Lorg an Ri agus scealta eile, Baile Ath Claith, Mac Ghuill, 1934
Bruth-Fa-Thiar, Baile Ath Cliath, Mac Ghuill, 1935.
Drecachta, Baile Ath Claith, Foilseachain an Rialtais, 1935.

References
Galway Authors, Helen Maher, 1976

People from County Galway
1884 births
Year of death missing
Irish male short story writers
20th-century Irish short story writers
20th-century Irish male writers